James A. McCann (March 7, 1924 – February 20, 2009) was an American politician.

Born in Freedom, Wisconsin, McCann graduated from Freedom High School and served in the United States Army during World War II and the Korea War. McCann graduated from University of Wisconsin–Madison. In 1965 and 1967, he served in the Wisconsin State Assembly. In 1968, he was elected to the Milwaukee Common Council. McCann then served as the City Comptroller of Milwaukee from 1972 to 1992.

Notes

1924 births
2009 deaths
People from Freedom, Outagamie County, Wisconsin
Politicians from Milwaukee
Military personnel from Wisconsin
University of Wisconsin–Madison alumni
Milwaukee Common Council members
20th-century American politicians
United States Army personnel of World War II
United States Army personnel of the Korean War
Democratic Party members of the Wisconsin State Assembly